Borrowed Clothes is a 1934 British drama film directed by Arthur Maude and starring Anne Grey, Lester Matthews and Sunday Wilshin.

It was made as a quota quickie for release by Columbia Pictures.

Cast
 Anne Grey as Lady Mary Torrent  
 Lester Matthews as Sir Harry Torrent  
 Sunday Wilshin as Lottie Forrest  
 Joe Hayman as Herman Jacob  
 Renée Macready as Diana Arbuthnot 
 P.G. Clark as Donald MacDonald  
 Philip Strange as Clarence Ponsonby  
 Anthony Holles as Gilbert Pinkley  
 Elizabeth Inglis as Barbara  
 Constance Shotter as Babette

References

Bibliography
 Chibnall, Steve. Quota Quickies: The Birth of the British 'B' Film. British Film Institute, 2007.
 Low, Rachael. Filmmaking in 1930s Britain. George Allen & Unwin, 1985.
 Wood, Linda. British Films, 1927-1939. British Film Institute, 1986.

External links

1934 films
British drama films
1934 drama films
Films directed by Arthur Maude
Quota quickies
British black-and-white films
1930s English-language films
1930s British films
English-language drama films